Donda is a 2021 album by Kanye West.

Donda may also refer to:

People 
 Donda West (1949–2007), teacher and the mother of Kanye West
 Mariano Donda (born 1982), Argentine footballer
 Victoria Donda (born 1977), Argentine human rights activist and legislator
 Professor A. Dońda, a fictional scientist made by Polish science fiction writer Stanisław Lem

Other 
 Donda (company), founded by Kanye West in 2012
 Donda 2, an album released exclusively on the Stem Player by Kanye West, 2022
 Donda (moth), a genus of moths of the family Erebidae
 "Donda Chant", by Kanye West, 2021
 Donda Academy, founded by Kanye West in 2022

See also